Stanford Lake is a natural mountain lake in the Eastern Sierra Nevada, in California.

It is near Mount Stanford on the Sierra Crest, in the Inyo National Forest.

See also
List of lakes in California

References

Lakes of Mono County, California
Inyo National Forest
Lakes of California
Lakes of Northern California